Moses Muchenje (born 16 December 1991) is a Zimbabwean football midfielder who currently plays for Harare City.

References

1991 births
Living people
Zimbabwean footballers
Gunners F.C. players
CAPS United players
Harare City F.C. players
Zimbabwe international footballers
Association football midfielders